Ideal is a British dark comedy television series originally broadcast on TV channel BBC Three, created by Graham Duff and produced by BBC Comedy North and Baby Cow Productions. It stars Johnny Vegas as small-time cannabis dealer Moz.

Ideal is set in Salford, Greater Manchester, chosen because Duff was familiar with the area, having done many stand-up gigs there during his youth. Most of the series takes place in Moz's flat and revolves around the eclectic array of characters who visit Moz to buy cannabis, socialise or both. The opening and closing theme is "Song of the Oss" from the album Nuada: Music Inspired By the Film the Wicker Man composed by British band Candidate.  The series features a number of tracks by Californian hip hop group Ugly Duckling and Pizzicato Five.

Ideal was broadcast on BBC Three in the UK, on entertainment channel 3e in Ireland and on ABC2 in Australia. First broadcast in 2005, seven series have been shown; the most recent ended on 30 June 2011. After the seventh series, Ideal was cancelled by the BBC.  Following the announcement, writer and creator Graham Duff wrote to fans "As some of you may have heard, the BBC have decided against commissioning an 8th series of Ideal. The reason given was that the new channel controller wanted to make a clean sweep.  It is a source of both pride and frustration that, at the point of cancellation, Ideal was attracting its biggest ever audiences, its highest profile guest stars and its best ever reviews. And the show is now being screened in more countries than ever before – from America to Finland and beyond".

Characters
 Moz (Johnny Vegas): a small-time cannabis dealer who has been dealing for a number of years from his flat in Salford which he used to share with his girlfriend Nicki but now shares with his new girlfriend Jenny. He deals only in the many varieties of marijuana and sees himself as 'providing a crucial service to the community". Moz rarely sets foot outside the front door of his apartment and seems to have no concept of keeping the flat tidy.
 Nicki (Nicola Reynolds): Moz's girlfriend for the first four series. She and Moz have a love/hate relationship, with Nicki constantly nagging Moz about the state of the flat. Nicki can be very assertive and openly opposed to several of Moz's more distinctive shortcomings.
 Cartoon Head aka Golova Sharzh (James Foster, series one / David Sant, series two): a man who never speaks and always wears a mask resembling a cartoon mouse.
 Craig / Steve (Seymour Leon Mace): the irritating loner Craig wasn't originally one of Moz's regular clients but after someone has recommended Moz as a good dealer to him, he keeps pestering Moz to let him visit the flat.
 'Psycho' Paul Nevin (Ryan Pope): originally a rival dealer to Moz, Psycho Paul now works with Cartoon Head.
 PC Phil Collins (Tom Goodman-Hill): Moz's mate and also his chief supplier. PC is a police constable for the Greater Manchester Police. He supplies Moz with weed which has been seized from other dealers during raids. PC is a useful contact for Moz, tipping him off as to what the latest police activity is - information which proves vital when the CID plan to raid the flat.
 Troy (Tony Burgess, also co-writer): Moz's half-brother.
 Kuldip (Ronny Jhutti): a former close friend of Moz. A relatively successful DJ (which Troy resents), he has a regular slot as a DJ at the local nightclub. He often boasts to Moz about the number of white label records he has in his box.
 Judith (Joanna Neary): moves in across the hall from Moz at the start of series two. She is a timid, demure necrophiliac who is constantly saying "sorry". She soon becomes the dealer's potential love interest; they are mutually attracted but he is disgusted at the idea of her having sex with dead bodies.
 Jenny (Sinead Matthews): a dim-witted young adult who becomes Moz's girlfriend near the end of series four.
 Felix (Des O'Malley): the teenage father of Jenny's baby.
 Stemroach (David Bradley): the sinister gangland boss who employs Cartoon Head and Psycho Paul as his henchmen.
 Brian (Graham Duff, who is also creator and writer of the show); a very camp and flamboyant homosexual.
 Colin (Ben Crompton): a bouncy, childlike petty criminal who is usually on probation, as he frequently reminds people.
 Carmel (Hanne Steen): a Spanish escort.
 Sangita (Sunetra Sarker): one of Moz's regular customers for a period.
 Yasuko (Haruka Kuroda): a bubbly and naive Japanese woman with a cleaning compulsion.
 Derrick (Alfie Joey): another regular customer whose obsession with vegetables Moz finds very boring.
 China (Natalie Gumede): along with her friend Asia, is one of Moz's regular clients.
 Asia (Rebecca Atkinson): friend of China's, who finds Moz to be repulsive.
 Silicon Valets (pronounced "Silicon Valleys"): Lee and Jason together are Silicon Valets, a pop group of indeterminate quality and style, who drop by to buy drugs and brag about their success.

 Jason (Tim Fallows): a member of the same boy band as Lee.
 Kim and Miko (Jessica Peh and Haruka Abe): Friends of Yasuko who are members of a Japanese girl band.
 Tanya (Emma Fryer): Colin's sister and also baby Sanjeev's health visitor.
 Alan (Peter Slater): the foreman of the builders who renovate Moz's flat after the fire.
 Marco (Andrew Lawrence): Alan's assistant builder.
 Reverend Jeff "Fist" Fistwick (Graham Duff; uncredited and in a mask): His flat is usually dark and unlit and Fist seems to spend a lot of time watching people come and go, seemingly with sinister intent.
 Chen (Hon Ping Tan): a member of the Low Triad, initially working for Min Yin Low.
 Tony (Dan Li): also a member of the Low Triad, initially working for Min Yin Low.
 Keith (Mick Miller): Moz's long lost stepfather.
 Xavier (Michael Kofi): a member of Psycho Paul's gang. He is infatuated by how comfortable one of Moz's chairs is.
 Dawn (Julia Davis): Jenny's mum who has cataracts.
 Jake/Dinos (Dylan Edwards) & (Sam Fletcher): Conjoined Twins.
 Carol (Jo Enright): Keith's blind girlfriend.
 Tilly (Janeane Garofalo): Moz's new neighbour in flat 6.
 Mr. Rupani (Vincent Ebrahim): Moz's landlord, as well as the landlord of the other flats in the block.
 Jess (Elinor Crawley): Nicki's sister/daughter.
 Amanda with the weird eyes: An unseen character (save for one scene in the final episode of series one, in which she is only seen from the back).

Guest stars

Guest stars have included Graham Fellows (as Dr Persil), Sean Lock (as Natalie/Nathaniel, Brian's transgender partner), Mark Radcliffe, Jason Manford (as Jack), Mark E Smith (as Jesus Christ), Paul Weller, Kara Tointon, Barry Adamson (as Brian's hitman boyfriend), Alan Yentob (as himself) and Rula Lenska (as the Red King).

Series overview

Episodes
Each series of Ideal has a different coloured title sequence.
Series 1 was sepia;
the Christmas special was red;
Series 2 was blue;
Series 3 was green;
Series 4 was purple;
Series 5 was red;
Series 6 was yellow and Series 7 is bondi blue.

Series 1 (2005)

Series 2 (2006)

Series 3 (2007)

Series 4 (2008)

Series 5 (2009)

Series 6 (2010)

Series 7 (2011)

Awards and nominations
In November 2006, Ideal received the award for Best Comedy Programme at the Royal Television Society North West Comedy Awards.

DVD release

A box set of series one (excluding the Christmas special episode) was released in the UK on 7 November 2005. It includes the following extras:
 Making of Ideal
 Out-takes
 Deleted scenes
 Commentaries from Johnny Vegas (Moz), Graham Duff (creator, writer, Brian and Reverend Fistwick) and Henry Normal (executive producer).

The second series (including the Christmas special) was released on DVD on 19 February 2007, the third series on 9 June 2008, the fourth series on 13 April 2009, and the fifth series on 19 July 2010. The sixth series was released on 11 October 2010. The seventh and final series was released on 25 July 2011.

Film
A film based on the TV series was planned. The last update was this in June 2012.
Baby Cow executive Henry Normal told Chortle: "It's going to be set in the same place, with many of the same characters. We even bought the physical set from the BBC, our co-producers on the TV series. We are aiming for it to be quite a dark psychological comedy-thriller".
As of 2019, there has been no word of the film being in production.

See also
 Top Buzzer
 Weeds

References

External links
 
 
 
 Ideal soundtrack music

2005 British television series debuts
2011 British television series endings
2000s British black comedy television series
2000s British comedy-drama television series
2010s British black comedy television series
2010s British comedy-drama television series
BBC black comedy television shows
BBC television sitcoms
English-language television shows
Television series about illegal drug trade
Television series about cannabis
Television shows set in Manchester